Ödön Bodor (né Ödön Krausz; 24 January 1882, Kapuvár – 22 January 1927, Budapest) was a Hungarian athlete. He competed at the 1908 Summer Olympics in London and at the 1912 Summer Olympics in Stockholm. He was Jewish.

Career
Bodor was born in Kapuvár. He was a member of the 1908 bronze medal medley relay team. Bodor ran the final 800 metres of the 1,600 metre race, following Pál Simon, Frigyes Wiesner, and József Nagy. In the first round, Bodor began his leg three yards behind the Swedish team and had to pass the other runner just to remain in competition. The time for the team in that round was 3:32.6. The final saw a reversal of fortune, however, as the American team was dominant. Bodor began with a five-yard lead over the Germans, however. He was unable to hold on to that lead, and finished inches behind the Germans at 3:32.5 to his opponents' 3:32.4 to receive a bronze rather than silver.

In the 800 metres, Bodor won his first round heat with a time of 1:58.6 to defeat a number of highly regarded athletes including defending champion James Lightbody. Bodor was one of four runners to beat Lightbody's record of 1:56.0 in the final, though he was the slowest of the four at 1:55.4.

Bodor also competed in the 1500 metres, though he did not advance past the first round. His heat in that round was full of capable athletes, including defending champion Lightbody (the defending champion in that event as well) and the winner of the heat, James P. Sullivan. Bodor placed eighth of nine in the field.

Bodor also played football. A midfielder, starting his career in 1900 at Újpesti FC.

See also
List of select Jewish track and field athletes

References

External links
 
 
 
 

1882 births
1927 deaths
People from Kapuvár
Újpest FC players
Hungarian male sprinters
Olympic athletes of Hungary
Athletes (track and field) at the 1908 Summer Olympics
Athletes (track and field) at the 1912 Summer Olympics
Olympic bronze medalists for Hungary
Medalists at the 1908 Summer Olympics
Olympic bronze medalists in athletics (track and field)
Hungarian footballers
Association football midfielders
Hungary international footballers
Sportspeople from Győr-Moson-Sopron County